Christian Nielsen (born 2 August 1988 in Randers) is a Danish rower.

References 

 

1988 births
Living people
Danish male rowers
People from Randers
World Rowing Championships medalists for Denmark
Sportspeople from the Central Denmark Region